Canoeing competitions at the 2021 Junior Pan American Games in Cali, Colombia, were held at the Calima Lake located in the municipality of Darién.

12 medal events are scheduled to be contested, all in sprint (six per gender).

Medal table

Medallists

Sprint
Men

Women

References

External links
Canoeing at the 2021 Junior Pan American Games

Junior Pan American Games
Events at the 2021 Junior Pan American Games
Qualification tournaments for the 2023 Pan American Games